Eunoe depressa is a scale worm known from off Alaska in the North Pacific and Arctic Oceans at depths of 35m or less.

Description
Number of segments 39; elytra 15 pairs. Dorsum with brown transverse bands, especially in first half of body. Anterior margin of prostomium with an acute anterior projection. Lateral antennae inserted ventrally (beneath prostomium and median antenna). Notochaetae distinctly thicker than neurochaetae. Bidentate neurochaetae absent.

Commensalism
E. depress is commensal. Its host taxa are hermit crabs and brachyuran crabs (Crustacea).

References

Phyllodocida
Animals described in 1905